Otakigawa Dam  is a dam in the Nagano Prefecture, Japan.

References

External links

Dams in Nagano Prefecture